Frederick Mannix may refer to:
 Frederick S. Mannix (1881–1951), Canadian businessman and the founder of the Mannix family
 Fred Mannix (Frederick Philip Mannix, born 1942), Canadian billionaire businessman
 Fred Mannix Jr. (born 1984), Canadian polo player